Rush Creek is a stream in Fillmore and Winona counties, in the U.S. state of Minnesota. It is a tributary of the Root River, which it joins in Rushford, Minnesota.

History
The creek was named for the rush plants lining its banks.

Rush Creek suffered severe flooding in the  Southeast Minnesota floods of August 1820, 2007.

According to the Minnesota Department of Natural Resources, fish species present in Rush Creek include: brown trout, brook trout, rainbow trout, white sucker, American brook lamprey, creek chub, northern hog sucker, golden redhorse, shorthead redhorse, brook stickleback, green sunfish, sculpin, longnose dace, blacknose dace, quillback and Johnny darter.  The Win-Cres Chapter of Trout Unlimited began a stream restoration project on Rush Creek in 2018.  There was damage to the restoration project in Spring 2019 flooding.  Rush Creek can be seen from the Enterprise Rest Area on Interstate 90.

See also
List of rivers of Minnesota
Rushford, Minnesota

External links

References

Rivers of Fillmore County, Minnesota
Rivers of Winona County, Minnesota
Rivers of Minnesota
Southern Minnesota trout streams
Driftless Area